Roar of the Dragon is a 1932 American Pre-Code adventure film directed by Wesley Ruggles and written by Howard Estabrook. The film stars Richard Dix, Gwili Andre, Edward Everett Horton, Arline Judge and ZaSu Pitts. The film was released on July 8, 1932, by RKO Pictures.

Cast 
 Richard Dix as Chauncey Carson
 Gwili Andre as Natascha
 Edward Everett Horton as Busby
 Arline Judge as Hortense O'Dare
 ZaSu Pitts as Gabby Woman
 Dudley Digges as Johnson
 C. Henry Gordon as Voronsky
 William Orlamond as Dr. Pransnitz
 Arthur Stone as Sholem
 Toshia Mori as Chinese Proprietor's Daughter
 Will Stanton as Sailor Sam

References

External links
 
 
 
 
 

1932 films
American black-and-white films
RKO Pictures films
Films directed by Wesley Ruggles
1932 adventure films
Films set in China
Films set in Manchukuo
American adventure films
1930s English-language films
1930s American films
English-language adventure films